Nana Akomea (born 5 August 1961) is a Ghanaian politician who has served as the Member of Parliament for Okaikwei South from 1997 to 2009, representing the New Patriotic Party.

Early life and education 
Akomea was born on 5 August 1961. He hails from Nsutam in the Fanteakwa District in the Eastern region of Ghana. In 1991, Akomea obtained a Post Graduate Degree in Communication Studies from the University of Ghana.

Career 
Akomea is a Journalist and Advertiser and communication expert. He worked at Focal Point Advertising Company before he became an MP.

Politics 
Akomea was the Director of Communications for the New Patriotic Party. He held this position since 31 January 2011 after the resignation of Kwaku Kwarteng, the previous director. In the political space, he has been the minister of information (2003-2005), and the Minister for Manpower Development and Employment (2007-2009).

Elections 
Akomea was elected as the Member of Parliament for the Okaikwei South constituency in the 5th parliament of the 4th republic of Ghana. He was elected with 35,438votes out of the 64,916 total valid votes cast, equivalent to 54.6% of total valid votes. He was elected over Isaac Mensah of the National Democratic Congress, William Aryee of the Democratic Freedom Party and Anthony Mensah of the Convention People's Party. These obtained 39.77%, 0.36% and 5.28% respectively of total valid votes cast.

1996 Elections 
Akomea contested for his constituency on the ticket of the New Patriotic Party in the 1996 Ghanaian General Elections. He defeated Agbemor Yeboah Ernest of the National Democratic Congress by obtaining 44.70% of the total votes cast which is equivalent to 35,284 votes whilst his counterpart obtained 29.00% of the total votes cast which is 22,928 votes in equivalence.

Personal life 
He is Christian (Presbyterian) and single with two children.

References

Living people
1961 births
New Patriotic Party politicians
Ghanaian MPs 1997–2001
Ghanaian journalists
University of Ghana alumni
People from Eastern Region (Ghana)
Ghanaian Presbyterians
Ghanaian Christians
Ghanaian MPs 2005–2009
Ghanaian MPs 2009–2013